Capitaine Pavel Vladimirovich Argeyev (March 1, 1887 – October 30, 1922), also known as Paul d'Argueev and The Eagle of Crimea, was a Russian-born flying ace of World War I, serving the French Armée de l'Air and Imperial Russian Air Service. Initially a high-ranking officer in the Imperial Russian Army, he transferred to France, where he became an aviator. He received a variety of decorations, both French and Russian, before dying in a flying accident in 1922.

Early life
Born in Yalta, Crimea, in 1887 to an engineer of steamships named Vladimir Akimovich Argeyev and his wife, Argeyev graduated from the military academy in Odessa in 1907 and Odessa College in 1909 and joined the Imperial Russian Army as a sergeant in the 184th Reserve Infantry Regiment in Warsaw, Poland. He was  promoted to lieutenant in 1912 and transferred to the 29th Chernigov Infantry Regiment, where he was made a lieutenant colonel.

Move to France
In 1914, on the outbreak of World War I, Argeyev resigned his Russian commission (after refusing to carry out a punishment on a soldier that he considered undeserved) and moved to France, enlisting in the French Foreign Legion with the rank of lieutenant on September 12, 1914. As with many airmen, he chose first to enlist in the infantry. He was assigned to the 131st Infantry Regiment, and participated in the Battle of the Marne, in which he received a head injury but returned to the front in October. He was awarded the Croix de Guerre, followed by an appointment as a chevalier of the Legion d'honneur in May 1915. In the process of winning these honors, Argeyev was wounded thrice, on 23 September 1915, in April 1916, and again on 2 May 1916.

Career as a pilot
In January 1916, having been ruled unfit for infantry service due to his injuries, Argeyev requested a transfer to the Armée de l'Air. After training at Pau, he was enlisted as a pilot on January 30, 1916. After having accumulated flying hours on the Western Front with Escadrille N48, he returned to Russia and was made a Captain of the Imperial Russian Air Service, assigned to the 12th Fighter Detachment on October 20, 1916.

Argeyev's first victory came four months later, on the morning of January 10, 1917 where he downed an Albatros C.V. An uncredited victory came four months later, on the evening April 8, when he downed a Fokker near Mitau, in modern-day Latvia. His second official victory came at 9:45am on April 21, followed by his third on May 6, which he shared with Ernst Leman and Alexander Kazakov. He downed a Hansa-Brandenburg C.I near Berezhany, Ukraine in his Nieuport 17. He then scored three more victories in three months - an LVG C.II at Jēkabpils on May 17, another Hansa-Brandenburg C.I near Kozova on June 8, and finally a Rumpler C.I on June 20. Now he was a flying ace, having scored more than five victories.

Return to France
In May 1918, as the Russian Revolution raged on, Argeyev returned to France due to the hostile attitudes of the Bolsheviks towards the Tsar's officer corps. Enlisting once more in the Armée de l'Air, he was assigned to Escadrille SPA.124, where he would spend the rest of the war.

His first victory came only days after joining the squadron, when he downed an LVG C.II on June 1, 1918. Now flying a SPAD XIII, within the few months he spent in the French air force, he considerably expanded his victory score.

Now sporting seven credited and one uncredited victory, he added two more on June 14 and 15 when he downed, respectively, a Rumpler C.I and another two-seater aircraft on successive days. He scored his tenth victory on June 26, another two-seater.

Despite downing no aircraft in July or August, in September 1918 he scored three victories, bringing his total to 13. Firstly, a Fokker D.VII north of Cerny on September 27, followed by two kills the day after, two two-seater aircraft near Séchault at 10:10am and 3:20pm. He again scored a double victory on October 5, albeit one of them uncredited - another two-seater north-east of Autry at 11:25am. However, he scored a credited victory in downing a Pfalz D.III at Orfeuil at 6:25pm.

His final victory of the war came on October 30, 1918, only 12 days before the end of the war. He scored a victory against a two-seater aircraft at 3:40pm near Quatre-Champs. By the end of hostilities, he had scored fifteen credited victories and two uncredited victories, making him Russia's third highest-scoring flying ace after Alexander Kazakov and Vasili Yanchenko.

Post-war and death
Reluctant to return to the USSR, he continued flying as a test pilot and was killed on October 20, 1922 near Trutnov, Czechoslovakia when his Potez aircraft crashed in the Sudetes mountains.

Honours and awards
 Officer of the Legion d'Honneur (France, 1915), previously awarded the Chevalier (1918)
 Croix de guerre 1914-1918 with 8 Palmes (France, 1915)
 Order of St. George, 4th Class with Swords (31 October 1917, for victories in aerial combat on 23 April 1917 and 5 April 1917)
 Order of St. Vladimir, 4th Class with Swords (18 December 1915, "for actions in the war against the Germans on the French front")
 Order of St. Anna, 2nd, 3rd and 4th classes
 Gold Sword for Bravery (21 November 1917, for the destruction of enemy aircraft 26 May 1917)

Legion d'honneur Citation
"A Russian national who took command of a company in November. Has shown by his actions great alacrity and the highest energy. He has complete authority over his men. He was lightly wounded on 17 April 1915, but retained command of his company."

List of aerial victories
See also Aerial victory standards of World War I

Confirmed victories are numbered and listed chronologically. Unconfirmed victories are denoted by "u/c" and may or may not be listed by date.

See also
 List of World War I flying aces
 Aerial victory standards of World War I

Endnotes

References

 Allen Durkota. The Imperial Russian Air Service: Famous Pilots and Aircraft and World War I. Flying Machines Press, 1995. , 9780963711021.
 Norman Franks Nieuport Aces of World War I. Osprey Publishing, 2000. , .
 Norman Franks; Russell Guest; Gregory Alegi. Above the War Fronts: The British Two-seater Bomber Pilot and Observer Aces, the British Two-seater Fighter Observer Aces, and the Belgian, Italian, Austro-Hungarian and Russian Fighter Aces, 1914–1918: Volume 4 of Fighting Airmen of WWI Series: Volume 4 of Air Aces of WWI. Grub Street, 1997. , .

Further reading
 Franks, Norman; Bailey, Frank (1993). Over the Front: The Complete Record of the Fighter Aces and Units of the United States and French Air Services, 1914–1918. London, UK: Grub Street Publishing. .

1880s births
1922 deaths
People from Yalta
People from Yaltinsky Uyezd
Russian World War I flying aces
Imperial Russian Air Force personnel
Russian military personnel of World War I
Aviators from the Russian Empire
Officers of the French Foreign Legion
Officiers of the Légion d'honneur
Recipients of the Order of St. Vladimir, 4th class
Recipients of the Order of St. Anna, 2nd class
Recipients of the Croix de Guerre 1914–1918 (France)
Recipients of the Gold Sword for Bravery